Ridin' Solo is the eleventh studio album by American R&B singer Keith Sweat. It was released on June 22, 2010 by Kedar Entertainment and Fontana Distribution. It debuted at number 13 on the US Billboard 200, also reaching number four on the US Top R&B/Hip-Hop Albums chart.

Critical reception

Allmusic editor Andy Kellman found that "due to a number of factors, Ridin Solo is the least significant volume of Sweat's discography [...] Sweat can't be knocked for riding the Auto-Tune gravy train, not when his use of vocal effects can be traced back 20-plus years. Then again, Ridin' Solo, the singer's tenth proper studio album, is slathered in it. Part of that is out of necessity; Sweat's voice, once a smooth whine, often hits a grainy strain, and it's also cloaked by a number of background vocalists who occasionally step in front to perform the hooks. While he is nearing his 50th birthday, Sweat sings lyrics that are less mature than the ones he recorded half his life ago, with references to Patrón, woman-as-vehicle metaphors, and couplets."

Track listing

Personnel
Credits for Ridin' Solo adapted from AllMusic.

 Adam Ledgister - Drum Programming, Engineer, Keyboards, Mixing, Producer, Synthesizer, Vocal Arrangement, Background vocals
 Adrian Albritton - Photography
 Luke Austin - Producer
 D. Babbs - Composer
 Durrell Babbs - Vocal Arrangement, Background vocals
 Chuckii Booker - Instrumentation, Producer
 D. Brown - Composer
 Dave Brown - Vocal Arrangement
 Carl M. Days Jr. - Background vocals
 Najja Edwards - Engineer, Mixing Assistant
 Gasner Hughes - Vocal Arrangement, Background vocals
 Bruce Irvine - Mixing
 Billy Ray Little - Composer
 Liz Loblack - Marketing
 Tony Martinez - Vocal Arrangement, Background vocals
 Harvey Mason, Jr. - Mixing

 Kedar Massenburg - Executive Producer
 W. Morris - Composer
 Wirlie Morris - Arranger, Drum Programming, Editing, Engineer, Producer, Strings, Synthesizer
 The Platinum Brothers - Producer
 Herb Powers - Mastering
 Angelo Remón - Composer, Drum Programming, Engineer, Producer, Synthesizer, Background vocals
 Jackie Rhinehart - Marketing
 S. Russell - Composer
 Steven Russell - Instrumentation, Producer, Vocal Arrangement, Background vocals
 Alvin Speights - Mixing
 Keith Sweat - Executive Producer, Primary Artist, Vocal Arrangement, Background vocals
 Antonine Tatum - Background vocals
 Dale Voelker - Art Direction, Design

Charts

Weekly charts

Year-end charts

References

Keith Sweat albums
2010 albums